Malik Saddu Khan or Sado Khan was a Pashtun figure, and the ancestor of the Sadduzai or Sadozai clan of the Abdali Pashtun tribe, to which belongs Ahmad Shah Abdali and some known families of Multan. He succeeded his father as chief of the Habibzai section of the tribe, but due to his "bravery and ability" he was selected by the Abdalis (later known as Durrani), then living between Kandahar and Herat, to be their overall leader in 1598. 

Shadi Khan, the governor of the Emperor Akbar at Kandahar, was hostile to Saddu Khan, so he went over to the interests of Abbas I of Persia, who had lost Kandahar in 1594 and was intriguing for its recovery. This he effected in 1621, after Akbar’s death. Saddu Khan died in 1626 leaving five sons, from whom have descended several well-known clans of the Durrani tribe. The descendants of Saddu Khan are known as Sadduzai and one branch of the family, to which Ahmad Shah Durrani, Timur Shah, Zaman Shah, Hassan Javaid Khan and Shuja Shah Durrani belonged, reigned for many years in Kabul.

He has been wrongly called 'Asadullah Khan' or 'Saadullah Khan' by some historians, but his real name was 'Saddu Khan'.

References

Pashtun people
History of Multan
1558 births
1621 deaths